Martina Michèle Weymouth (born November 22, 1950) is an American musician, singer, songwriter, and a founding member and bassist of the new wave group Talking Heads and its side project Tom Tom Club, which she co-founded with her husband, Talking Heads drummer Chris Frantz. In 2002, Weymouth was inducted into the Rock and Roll Hall of Fame as a member of Talking Heads.

Early life
Born in Coronado, California, Weymouth is the daughter of Laura Bouchage and U.S. Navy Vice Admiral Ralph Weymouth (1917–2020). The third of seven children, her siblings include Lani and Laura Weymouth, who are collaborators in Tina's band Tom Tom Club, and architect Yann Weymouth, the designer of the Salvador Dalí Museum in Florida. Weymouth is of Breton heritage on her mother's side (she is the great-granddaughter of Anatole Le Braz, a Breton writer). Her mother was an immigrant from Brittany and her father was American.

When she was 12, Weymouth joined the Potomac English Hand Bell Ringers, an amateur music group directed by Nancy Tufts, and toured with them. At 14, she started to teach herself the guitar.

Talking Heads
As a student at the Rhode Island School of Design, she met Chris Frantz and David Byrne, who formed a band called the Artistics. She began dating Frantz and served as the band's driver. After graduation, the three of them moved to New York City. Since Byrne and Frantz were unable to find a suitable bass guitar player she joined them at the latter's request, and began learning and playing the instrument.

As a bass player she combined the minimalist art-punk bass lines of groups such as Wire and Pere Ubu with danceable, funk-inflected riffs to provide the bedrock of Talking Heads' signature sound.

Other musical activities

Full members of the Compass Point All Stars, Weymouth and Frantz formed the Tom Tom Club in 1980, which kept them busy during a fairly long hiatus in Talking Heads activity. When it became obvious that Talking Heads frontman David Byrne had no interest in another Talking Heads album, Weymouth, Frantz, and Jerry Harrison reunited without him for a single album called No Talking, Just Head under the name "The Heads" in 1996, featuring a rotating cast of vocalists. Weymouth has been critical of Byrne, describing him as "a man incapable of returning friendship".

She co-produced the Happy Mondays' 1992 album Yes Please! and contributed backing vocals and percussion for the alternative rock virtual band Gorillaz on their track "19-2000".

Weymouth was a judge for the second annual Independent Music Awards to support independent artists' careers. She collaborated with Chicks on Speed on their cover of the Tom Tom Club's "Wordy Rappinghood" for their album 99 Cents in 2003 along with other female musicians such as Miss Kittin, Kevin Blechdom, Le Tigre, and Adult's Nicola Kuperus. "Wordy Rappinghood" became a moderate dance hit in Europe, peaking at number two in the Dutch Top 40, number five on the Belgian Dance Chart, and at number seven on the UK Singles Chart.

Personal life
Weymouth and Chris Frantz have been married since 1977. They live in Fairfield, Connecticut, and have two sons. Her niece, Katharine Weymouth, served as publisher of The Washington Post.

In March 2022, Weymouth and Frantz were in a car collision with a drunk driver. Weymouth suffered a fractured sternum and three fractured ribs.

Equipment
 Höfner 500/2 Club Bass – Two pickup with single-cutaway hollowbody, purchased in 1978
 Veillette-Citron Standard 4 String – Neck Through, teal green
 Fender Mustang Bass – Used in early Talking Heads performances
 Gibson Les Paul Triumph Bass - used in early Talking Heads performances
 Fender Jazz Bass – Used for Tom Tom Club live performances
 Steinberger L-Series Bass – Seen during Little Creatures period
 Fender Swinger Guitar – Seen in Stop Making Sense during the performance of "This Must Be the Place (Naive Melody)"
 Chapman Stick

References

Further reading

External links

1950 births
20th-century American guitarists
20th-century bass guitarists
21st-century American women singers
American new wave musicians
American people of Breton descent
American people of French descent
American rock bass guitarists
Women bass guitarists
Women new wave singers
American women rock singers
Guitarists from California
Living people
People from Coronado, California
People from Fairfield, Connecticut
Rhode Island School of Design alumni
Rhode Island School of Design alumni in music
Singers from California
Talking Heads members
Tom Tom Club members
American women in electronic music
American post-punk musicians
21st-century American singers
20th-century American women guitarists